Columbia Building may refer to:

in the United States
(by state)
Columbian Building, Topeka, Kansas, listed on the NRHP in Kansas
 Columbia Building (Louisville, Kentucky)
 Columbia Building (Kansas City, Missouri), listed on the NRHP in Missouri
 Columbia Building (Columbus, Ohio), listed on the NRHP in Ohio

See also
Columbia Hall (disambiguation)
Columbian School (disambiguation)
Columbia Historic District (disambiguation)